The 2012–13 season was West Ham Uniteds first season back in the Premier League after a one-year absence. West Ham gained promotion by winning the 2012 Championship play-off final against Blackpool at the end of the 2011–12 campaign.

Season summary
21 May 2012: West Ham announced the signing of goalkeeper Stephen Henderson making him the first signing in this transfer window.
23 May 2012: West Ham United released six senior players following the conclusion of the 2011–2012 season. Among those departing were Julien Faubert, John Carew, Abdoulaye Faye, Papa Bouba Diop, Frank Nouble and Olly Lee.
13 June 2012: West Ham United sign goalkeeper Jussi Jääskeläinen on a free transfer to join the club when his contract at Bolton Wanderers expires.
20 June 2012: West Ham United announce the signing of midfielder Mohamed Diamé to join the club after the expiration of his contract at Wigan Athletic.
21 June 2012: After nearly six years with the club, goalkeeper Robert Green fails to agree a new contract and moves to Queens Park Rangers on a free transfer.
1 July 2012: West Ham United announce the signing of George McCartney from Sunderland after a successful loan stint at West Ham during the 2011–12 promotion winning season. West Ham also announce the departure of Marek Štěch by mutual consent.
18 July 2012: The club announce the signing of forward Modibo Maïga for an undisclosed fee from French club Sochaux.
23 July 2012: The signing of young Swiss goalkeeper Raphael Spiegel from Grasshoppers for an undisclosed fee is announced.
1 August 2012: The club announces the return of experienced defender James Collins on a four-year deal for an undisclosed fee from Aston Villa.
10 August 2012: The transfer of French midfielder Alou Diarra from Marseille on a three-year contract for an undisclosed fee is confirmed.
18 August 2012: West Ham kick the season off with a 1–0 home win against Aston Villa. James Collins, Jussi Jääskeläinen, Mohamed Diamé and Modibo Maïga all make their competitive debuts.
24 August 2012: The club announces the signing of winger Matt Jarvis from Wolverhampton Wanderers on a five-year contract, with the option for an additional year, for a transfer fee which was a club record but was officially undisclosed.
25 August 2012: West Ham travel to Swansea City for their first away match of the season and are comfortably beaten 3–0.
30 August 2012: Liverpool striker, Andy Carroll signs on a season-long loan with the option to complete a permanent deal for an undisclosed fee in the summer of 2013.
31 August 2012: Yossi Benayoun signs on-loan from Chelsea for the season, becoming their 11th signing of the transfer window.
1 September 2012: West Ham bounce back from defeat by Swansea by beating Fulham 3–0 at home.
12 September 2012: West Ham's oldest surviving player, Jimmy Andrews, dies aged 85.
15 September 2012: West Ham earn their first away points of the season in a 0–0 draw with Norwich City.
22 September 2012: West Ham's 100% home record is ended by a 1–1 draw with Sunderland.
25 September 2012: Just over a year after being diagnosed with testicular cancer, striker Dylan Tombides makes his debut for West Ham in a 4–1 home defeat by Wigan in the League Cup
1 October 2012: Eight players receive a yellow card, a Premier League record, as West Ham record their first away win of the season, a 2–1 win at QPR with goals by Matt Jarvis, his first for the club, and Ricardo Vaz Tê.
6 October 2012: The Hammers lose against London rivals Arsenal 3–1 at home. Mohamed Diamé scores his first goal for the club.
20 October 2012: Fellow promotees Southampton are comfortably beaten 4–1 at Upton Park.
27 October 2012: West Ham lose their second away game of the season 2–1 against Wigan.
3 November 2012: The current Premier League champions Manchester City are held to a 0–0 draw by West Ham.
11 November 2012: West Ham win outside London for the first time this season with a 1–0 away win at Newcastle United. It is also their first win away to Newcastle since 1998.
19 November 2012: The Hammers extend their unbeaten run to three games with a 1–1 draw against Stoke City.
25 November 2012: West Ham are beaten 3–1 by London rivals Tottenham Hotspur. Andy Carroll scores his first goal for the club.
28 November 2012: Manchester United defeat West Ham 1–0 at Old Trafford.
1 December 2012: West Ham announce that on loan striker Andy Carroll has been ruled out for up to eight weeks due to a knee injury. Later that day, the Hammers complete an emphatic victory against London rivals Chelsea, winning 3–1.
5 December 2012: West Ham are named preferred tenants for the Olympic Stadium.
9 December 2012: West Ham lose 2–3 at home to Liverpool after leading 2–1 at half time. Mohamed Diamé tears his hamstring in the match.
16 December 2012: West Ham pick up a point at The Hawthorns, drawing 0–0 to West Bromwich Albion.
19 December 2012: The Boxing Day clash away at Arsenal is called off due to industrial action on the London Underground.
22 December 2012: Carlton Cole picks up West Ham's first red card of the season in a 2–1 defeat by Everton.
27 December 2012: The FA overturns Cole's red card he picked up against Everton after a successful appeal.
29 December 2012: West Ham are beaten 1–0 by fellow promotees Reading.
1 January 2013: The Hammers start 2013 with a home win against Norwich, 2–1. Joey O'Brien celebrates his 50th appearance for the club with a goal.
5 January 2013 Recently signed from Liverpool, Joe Cole provides the assists for both goals, scored by James Collins, in a 2–2 home draw with Manchester United in the FA Cup third round.
9 January 2013: West Ham co-chairman David Gold is admitted to hospital suffering from pneumonia.
12 January 2013: West Ham lose for the first time in 2013 after being beaten 3–0 by Sunderland at the Stadium of Light.
16 January 2013: A 1–0 defeat by Manchester United at Old Trafford sees West Ham exit the FA Cup in the third round.
19 January 2013: Joe Cole rescues a point for West Ham who draw 1–1 at home with QPR.
23 January 2013: A 5–1 defeat by Arsenal at the Emirates gives West Ham their heaviest defeat of the season in a match which also sees Dan Potts taken to hospital with concussion.
22 March 2013: West Ham are confirmed as the anchor tenants for the Olympic Stadium. They will pay £15 million towards the conversion of the stadium, pay £2 million a year in rent and will move to the stadium in 2016.
8 May 2013: Winston Reid is named Hammer of the Year for the 2012–13 season.
12 May 2013: West Ham lose their last away game of the season 2–0 to Everton. West Ham finish with only 11 away goals, the lowest in the league.
19 May 2013: On the final day of the 2012–13 Premier League season, West Ham beat already relegated Reading 4–2 with a hat-trick scored by Kevin Nolan. They end the season in tenth place with 46 points collected from 38 matches.
24 May 2013: West Ham achieve the highest average home attendance in their 118-year history: 659,677 supporters attended home games, an average of 34,720 per game.

Final League table

Squad

Out on loan

Results

Pre-season

Premier League

Results by matchday

FA Cup

Football League Cup

Statistics

Overview

Goalscorers

League position by matchday

Appearances and goals

|-
! colspan=12 style=background:#dcdcdc; text-align:center| Goalkeepers

|-
! colspan=12 style=background:#dcdcdc; text-align:center| Defenders

|-
! colspan=12 style=background:#dcdcdc; text-align:center| Midfielders

|-
! colspan=12 style=background:#dcdcdc; text-align:center| Forwards

|}

Transfers

Summer

In

Out

Winter

In

Out

References

External links
 West Ham United FC Official Website

West Ham United
West Ham United F.C. seasons
West Ham United
West Ham United